The British School of Fashion (BSoF) is a university that teaches marketing and fashion management.

History 
It is based in East London, in the campus of GCULondon, near Spitalfields and opened in 2013, focusing on fashion business and management, not fashion design. Shortly after, plans for a New York branch to open that same month were announced with Muhammad Yunus leading that branch.

Courses
MBA Luxury Brand Management
MSc Luxury Brand Marketing
MSc Fashion Business Creation
MSc Fashion & Lifestyle Marketing

Marks and Spencer partnership 
Since 2013, a Marks and Spencer design studio is installed in the GCU London Campus in collaboration with BSoF.

References

External links 

GCU page

Organizations established in 2013
Business schools in England
Glasgow Caledonian University
Fashion industry